Frank Schuster (born January 15, 1955) is a German former footballer.

External links

1955 births
Living people
Footballers from Dresden
German footballers
East German footballers
Dynamo Dresden players
Dynamo Dresden II players
DDR-Oberliga players
Association football midfielders